Souad Adel Faress (born 25 March 1948) is a stage, radio, television and film actress based in United Kingdom. She is best known for her portrayal of the solicitor Usha Gupta, in the long-running BBC Radio 4 serial The Archers and for her role as the High Priestess of the Dosh Khaleen in the sixth season of the HBO series Game of Thrones. Born in Ghana, she also holds Syrian and Irish citizenships.

Biography
Faress was born in 1948 in Accra, Ghana, to Irish and Syrian parents. She grew up in Southport, Lancashire, studied drama at the Guildhall School of Music and Drama and lives in London. She has been exploring playwriting as a medium since before 2004. Faress completed a writing course at City Literary Institute adult education college. Her other skills include dancing, horse riding, cricket and yoga.

Career
Faress appeared in two episodes of the BBC serial I, Claudius (1976) as a slave girl (shouting fire) and as a dancer who at Messalina's (second and bigamous) marriage party realises troops are coming to arrest them. In another early BBC appearance, she played the character Selma in the Blake's 7 episode 'Horizon'. Since then, Faress has had substantial roles in films such as My Beautiful Laundrette (1985) and Sixth Happiness (1997), as well as much stage work around the UK.

In October 2001 she appeared briefly in Coronation Street as Dev Alahan's mother Umila.

Souad Faress also appeared as the Old Rani in The Sarah Jane Adventures serial The Mad Woman in the Attic in October 2009.

In October 2014, it was announced that Faress would perform in Hurried Steps, Sharon Wood's translation of "Passi Affrettati by Dacia Maraini. The play's narratives were mainly sourced from Amnesty International, the subject matter including rape, honour killings, sex trafficking and other issues of violence against women.

Between 2010 and 2011 she played Jay Faldren's grandmother, Maryam Shakiba, in Casualty.

Faress appeared in an episode of popular nursing drama No Angels as lead character, Anji Mittel's aunt Di. Faress appeared briefly as a hospital doctor in "The Dead of Jericho", the first episode of Inspector Morse.

In 2016 she joined the HBO series Game of Thrones in Season 6 as the High Priestess of the Dosh Khaleen. Faress also appeared in ITV drama Brief Encounters, "a loose adaptation of Ann Summers CEO Jacqueline Gold's memoirs, Good Vibrations".

In 2019, Faress appeared as a recurring character in Daisy Haggard and Laura Solon's sitcom Back to Life.

See also
 List of Ghanaian actors and actresses

References

External links 

1948 births
Living people
Alumni of the Guildhall School of Music and Drama
The Archers
BBC people
British film actresses
British radio actresses
British stage actresses
British television actresses
English people of Irish descent
English people of Syrian descent
Ghanaian emigrants to England
Ghanaian film actresses
Ghanaian people of Irish descent
Ghanaian people of Syrian descent
People from Accra
Actresses from London